Jebrael Nokandeh (Persian: جبرئیل نوکنده) is an Iranian archaeologist. He is director of National Museum of Iran.

Career
Jebrael Nokandeh received his MA in archaeology from Tehran University and his Ph.D. from the Free University of Berlin. He is the Director of the National Museum of Iran. He is a member of the Research Council of Iranian Center for Archaeological Research (ICAR) and a scientific member of the Research Institute of the Cultural Heritage and Tourism (RICHT).  During the Government Week Celebration in late 2016, he was chosen as the Outstanding Director within the Iranian Cultural Heritage, Handicrafts, and Tourism Organization.

Nokandeh is an experienced field archaeologist with extensive experience in Iran, including Khuzestan, the Mehran Plain in the Ilam Province, in the Caspian Littoral of Gilan and the Golestan Province, where he conducted survey and excavations in the Gorgan Wall Project.
 
As director of the National Museum in 2015, he established a new prehistoric exhibition on the second floor of the Museum and completed the 9-year-old renovation and restoration of the Islamic Era Museum. His focus has been on the data integration of the various departments, organizing storage areas and producing various catalogs of the museum’s important collections. He organized and directed highly successful exhibitions locally and at foreign museums in Italy, India and Germany. The National Museum hosted an exhibition of works from the Louvre in March 2018.

Selected publications
Nokandeh, J. 2004 „The Metal Vessels of the Gorgan Plain: Bazgir Hoard“, in: ABSTRACTS in 4th International Congress on the Archaeology of the Ancient Near East (4. ICAA¬NE), 29-March-3 April, Freie Universität Berlin, p. 109.
Ohtsu, T., Nokandeh, J. and Takuro, A. 2004 „Excavation Research of Tappe Jalaliye”, in: Ohtsu, T., Nokandeh, J. and Yama¬uchi, K. (eds.) Preliminary Report of the Iran Japan Joint Archaeological Expe¬dition to Gilan, Second Season. 2002, Iranian Cultural Heritage and Tourism Organization, Tehran, Middle Eastern Culture Center in Japan, Tokyo, pp. 48–84.
Nokandeh, J,. 2004 „Excavation of Tappe Jalaliye: Outline of Excavation 2004”, in: Ohtsu, T., No¬kandeh, J. and Yamauchi, K. (eds.) Preliminary Report of the Iran Japan Joint Archaeological Expedition to Gilan, Fourth Season, Iranian Cultural Heritage and Tourism Organization, Tehran, Middle Eastern Culture Center in Japan, Tokyo, pp. 61–67.
Nokandeh, J. 2005 „Arg-e Dasht, the first Neolithic Discovered Region in Gilan province” in: Oht¬su, T., Nokandeh, J., Yamauchi, K. (eds.) preliminary Report of the Iran Japan Joint Archaeological Expedition to Gilan: Fourth Season, Iranian Cultural He¬ritage and Tourism Organization, Tehran, Middle Eastern Culture Center in Japan, Tokyo, pp. 50–56.
Nokandeh, J., Sauer, E., Omrani Rekavandi, H., Wilkinson, T., Abbasi, G.A., Schwenninger, J.-L., Mahmoudi, M., Parker, D., Fattahi, M., Usher-Wilson, L.S., Ershadi, M., Ratcliffe, J. und Gale, R., 2006   Linear Barriers of Northern Iran: The Great Wall of Gorgan and the Wall of Tammishe.’ Iran, Vol .44: 121-73.
Nokandeh, J. 2010: „Archaeological Survey in the Mehran plain, South-western Iran“ in: Matthiae, P., Pinnock, F., Nigro, L. Marchett, N., Romano, L. (eds), Proceedings of the 6th International Congress on the Archaeology of the An¬cient Near East May, 5th-10th 2008, “Sapienza” - Università di Roma. Harrasso¬witz, Wiesbaden. Vol. 2: 483-509.
Berberian, M. Malek Shahmirzadi, S. Nokandeh,J AND Djamali, M.,  2012, Archaoseimicity and environmental Crises at the Sialk Mounds, Central Iranian Plateau, Since the early Neolithic, Journal of Archaeological Science. 39:  2845-2858.
Sauer Eberhard, Nokandeh,Jebrael, Omrani Rekavandi, Hamid  2015 Forts and Mega-Fortresses, natural and artificial barriers: the grand strategy of the Sasanian Empire, in: Abstracts   International Congress of Young Archaeologist, Azizi Kharanaghi, Khanipour,M and Naseri,R(eds), tehran,RICHTO press,PP 154.

References

External links 

Iran, France hold joint museum exhibition
UK foreign office minister visits National Museum of Iran
National Museum to be restored

Iranian archaeologists
Living people
1972 births